Alexis Sosa (born 22 July 1999) is an Argentine professional footballer who plays as a centre-back for Ferro Carril Oeste on loan from Banfield.

Career
Sosa started his professional career with Argentine Primera División side Banfield, making his debut on 10 September 2016 in a league draw against Colón.

Career statistics
.

References

External links

1999 births
Living people
People from Burzaco
Argentine footballers
Association football defenders
Argentine Primera División players
Club Atlético Banfield footballers
Ferro Carril Oeste footballers
Sportspeople from Buenos Aires Province